Miss Earth Albania, formerly "Miss Shqiptarja", is the national beauty pageant preliminary of Miss Earth in Albania. The winner represents Albania to the Miss Earth pageant from 2006 to 2009. In 2013, Agnesa Vuthaj, a former Miss Albania herself, started the National Directorship of Miss Earth Albania.

History
Miss Earth Albania emerged from the pageant, Miss Shqiptarja held in United Kingdom, an international pageant dedicated to Albanian women. In 2006, the winner of Miss Shqiptarja 2006 (Blerta Halili) participated in Miss Earth 2006 in the Philippines. The pageant was moved to Shkodër, Albania and changed its name to Miss Earth Albania to promote environmental protection in Albania. The pageant is under the direction of Enkeleida Omi, Artan Zeneli, and Tauland Omi of Alba Media Entertainment until 2009.  Agnesa Vuthaj is now the Albanian National Director for  Miss Earth.

Titleholders

See also
Miss Earth

References

External links 
Miss Earth Albania official website

Albania
Beauty pageants in Albania
Miss Earth
2006 establishments in Albania